Transportation for America (or T4A) is an American policy organization that supports progressive transportation and land use policy. The transportation program of Smart Growth America, T4A supports reforming transportation policy at the federal, state, and local levels.

History 
During the Trump presidency, the organization criticized the administration over proposed cuts to federal funding for public transit. In 2020, the organization's director Beth Osborne criticized efforts to cut transit funding amid the economic crisis that emerged in the  COVID-19 pandemic.

In 2021, T4A urged the Biden Administration to allocate increased funding for public transportation. Alongside multiple labor unions and environmental organization, T4A urged the addition of $10 billion in public transit funding in the White House-backed reconciliation bill.

Policy goals 
According to the organization, its policy goals include greater investments in public transportation, smart growth, and environmentalism. T4A has engaged with federal policymakers to push for increased funding for public transit.

Membership 
In addition to individuals who may participate, T4A's membership roster includes a number of governments, as well as housing, business, environmental, public health, transportation, equitable development, and other organizations.

Leadership 
The current director of Transportation for America is Beth Osborne, who formerly served as Acting Assistant Secretary for Transportation Policy and as Deputy Assistant Secretary for Transportation Policy in the Department of Transportation during the Obama Administration.

References

External links
Official website

Lobbying organizations in the United States
Transportation associations in the United States